Varuna Seneviratne Kithsirimewan Waragoda (born February 18, 1971) in Colombo, is a Sri Lankan former first class cricketer who played in more than 100 matches.

A left-handed batsman, Waragoda made 6141 First Class runs at an average of 48.73 during his career. He also scored 14 First Class centuries.  Waragoda represented the Burgher Recreation Club, Colombo Cricket Club, Galle Cricket Club and Tamil Union Cricket and Athletic Club.

He attendedD.S. Senanayake College.

References

External links
 

1971 births
Sri Lankan cricketers
Living people
Tamil Union Cricket and Athletic Club cricketers
Colombo Cricket Club cricketers